Stoners Reeking Havoc is the Kottonmouth Kings' first EP-CD released on February 24, 1998. Kottonmouth Kings also put tracks 1,3 and 4 on their next three albums. In a 2015 interview with Johnny Richter, he stated that he was a member of the group at the time of the EP's release but wasn't on it due to personal issues with another member of the group.

Track listing

Personnel
Daddy X - Vocals, Lyrics
D-Loc - Vocals, Lyrics
Saint Dog - Vocals, Lyrics
DJ Bobby B - DJ, Engineering, Programmer, Turntables

References 

1998 EPs
Kottonmouth Kings albums
Suburban Noize Records albums
Capitol Records albums